The Bournemouth and Poole College (BPC) is a well established educational provider which delivers further education, higher education and community based courses in Bournemouth and in Poole on the south coast of England. It is one of the larger British colleges with thousands of learners each year.

Campuses 
The college is based at three sites in Bournemouth and Poole. It's based at Lansdowne (in Bournemouth), North Road (in Poole) and The Fulcrum (Poole).

Lansdowne
The Lansdowne campus is located on the eastern side of Bournemouth town centre on the roundabout linking Bath Road, Meyrick Road, Christchurch Road and Holdenhurst Road. The main building has a large clocktower facing the roundabout. It is close to the East Cliff and Bournemouth University's Lansdowne Campus and a short distance from both the Bournemouth Station travel Interchange and from Bournemouth University's Talbot Campus.
Lansdowne is where the sixth form centre, beauty and holistic therapies, digital and computing, hairdressing, hospitality & catering, travel tourism & sport, vocational studies, workforce development, and business & professional studies are based.

The college was originally the Bournemouth Municipal College which opened in 1913. It is a listed building and is known for its clock tower (said to be an 'eyesore' when first built). A public library was part of the building until 2002. A small number of 'Horsa huts' were built in the 1940s and a large three-floor extension opened in 1957. In 1960 it took over the former Bournemouth School for Girls buildings which were two old Victorian houses (Ascham House [listed building] and Woodcote) which were used as the school when it opened in 1917. A building was built between these in 1932 which is now the catering block. The college and library were made a grade II listed building in 1973. Woodcote is now used for hairdressing and beauty therapy courses. Although modernised, no large extensions have been built to the present day.

North Road
The North Road campus is located near Poole Park and The Civic Centre.

Art and design, care education and community training (including childcare and nursing) teacher training and engineering services, and some applied computing courses are based here. North Road is also the base for pre-vocational programme courses for students with learning difficulties and disabilities.

This was Poole Technical College; the first three-storey building was built in 1957 with a small workshop block. It was not until 1967 that the major building, canteen and library were built along with more workshops. There are a number of wooden huts used for child and social care dating from the 1970s and a small number of offices in portable cabins across the centre. In 1989 the bricklaying block was built.

In the 1990s The Study Gallery was built, before being relaunched as KUBE in April 2009. This purpose-built, modern glass-fronted building was a prominent art gallery in the South West of England. The gallery was closed in 2010 due to lack of funding and the building is now being used for the college's Digital Design Centre.

In 2016 the College stopped using its Constitution Hill site and instead opened up a new multi million pound site, the Jellicoe Theatre building, in Danecourt Road.

Constitution Hill
Located at the bottom of the hill on Constitution Hill Road, Poole, this site was sold to Poole Council in 2015.

It was opened in 1919 as Poole Sea Training School and was also used as a Barnardos children's home (Parkstone Sea Training School). As a college it has been modernised with the library being built in 1997.

The Upper Constitution Hill site, was known as Shaftesbury House. A high level complex of buildings contained the classrooms, while below was a building used for the technology classes for practical sessions, such as plumbing and light engineering. From 1967– 1971 the college was used by CEGB apprentices attending from the Poole Power Station Instrument Training School on 'block release' to college (month and month about training school/college). During this time a Mr Davies was Principal of the Shaftsbury House. Students followed City and Guilds Instrument Craft Practise course 309 and this changed in 1969 to Industrial Measurement and Control Technicians Certificate course 310 of City and Guilds.

At one time there was an 'Upper Constitution Hill Centre' which has since moved to North Road because it was sold by the college to build a housing estate. For the last 13 years the college has planned to sell off LCH and its Knighton Heath site and for them to move to the North Road site. However funding is the problem.

Redlands
Located on Knyveton Road (between Lansdowne and Boscombe, Bournemouth), this is now used as offices by Wessex Education Shared Services (WESS).
It was built as a Victorian hotel and used by a private school from London during the Second World War.

The Fulcrum
A site on the Fulcrum industrial estate, Tower Park, Poole for building services and construction crafts.

Further education courses 
The college has 24 curriculum areas and runs hundreds of courses including:

 Advances Technologies
 Beauty
 Business Administration
 Business and Accounting
 Construction Crafts
 Design & Creative Arts
 Digital and Computing
 Early Years, Education, Health & Social Care
 Engineering
 ESOL
 Financial Services
 Foundation Studies
 Hairdressing
 Hospitality and Catering
 Marine Technology
 Media
 Motor Vehicle
 Music
 Performing Arts
 Renewable Technologies
 Retail
 Social and Applied Sciences
 Sport
 Teacher Training
 Travel & Tourism
 Uniformed Services

Higher education, university level qualifications and degree centre 
The higher education section of the college provides a range of degree level qualifications including:
 Foundation Degree – Arts (FdA)
 Foundation Degree – Sciences (FdA)
 Foundation Degree – Engineering (FdEng)
 Bachelor's degree (Honours) – Arts (BA)
 Bachelor's degree (Honours) – Science (BSc)
 Higher National Diploma – HND
 Higher National Certificate – HNC

All HE courses are validated by an established university and provide an identified route to a 3rd Years Honours top up where appropriate.

Full-time subjects

 Business Computing (FdSc)
 Business & Management (FdA)
 Creative Multimedia Design (FdA)
 3D CGI:Architectural Visualisation (FdSc/BSc)
 3D CGI:Modelling and Animation (FdSc/BSc)
 Computer Game Technology (FdSc)
 Computing with Networking (FdSc)
 Finance and Law (FdA)
 Marketing Communications (FdA)
 Music and Sound technology (FdSc)
 Performing Arts- Contemporary Theatre (FdA)
 Performing Arts- Dance (FdA)
 Performing Arts- Music Theatre (FdA)
 Professional Culinary Arts (FdA)
 Public Service (FdA)
 Radio Production (FdA)
 Tourism and Events Management (FdA)
 Tourism and Hospitality Management (FdA)
 Tourism Management (FdA)

Part-time subjects
 Post Compulsory Education(BA)
 Certificate in Education (PGCE)
 Early Years (FdA)
 Electronics and Computer Technology (HNC/FdSc)
 Engineering - Electrical Design (HNC/FdEng)
 Engineering – Manufacturing Management (HNC/FdEng)
 Engineering – Mechanical Design (HNC/FdEng)
 Engineering – Marine Technologies (HNC/FdEng)
 Architectural	Technology (HNC)
 Construction Management (HNC)
 Quantity Surveying (HNC)

References

External links 
 
 Higher Education website
mybpc and VLE – requires College login
Library catalogue
SWYM / CWYM / BPC College Matters
Improve Bournemouth and Poole College

Buildings and structures in Bournemouth
Education in Bournemouth
Education in Poole
Further education colleges in Dorset
Educational institutions established in 1913
1913 establishments in England